Yahia Fofana (born 21 August 2000) is a French professional footballer who plays as a goalkeeper for  club Angers.

Club career

Le Havre 
A product of Le Havre's academy, Fofana signed his first professional contract on 4 July 2019, with the deal lasting until 2022. His debut came not long after, as he started a Coupe de la Ligue match against Clermont on 13 August. The match ended in a 4–3 victory for Clermont on penalties after a 1–1 draw.

Fofana's Coupe de France debut came on 19 January 2021, as his side lost to Paris FC by a score of 1–0. On 30 January, he played his first match in Ligue 2, coming on as a substitute after Mathieu Gorgelin had been handed a red card in a 0–0 draw away to Chamois Niortais. In the 2021–22 season with Le Havre, he broke into the first team as the starting goalkeeper, surpassing Gorgelin in the pecking order.

Angers 
On 30 May 2022, Fofana signed a four-year contract with Ligue 1 side Angers, joining the club upon the expiration of his Le Havre contract.

International career 
Fofana has represented France at U16, U17, U18, and U19 level over the years.

Personal life 
Born in France, Fofana is of Malian descent.

Career statistics

References

External links 
 

2000 births
Living people
Footballers from Paris
French footballers
France youth international footballers
Association football goalkeepers
Red Star F.C. players
Le Havre AC players
Angers SCO players
Championnat National 3 players
Championnat National 2 players
Ligue 2 players

Black French sportspeople
French sportspeople of Malian descent